The Myyrmanni bombing took place on October 11, 2002, in Myyrmäki, Vantaa, Finland, in Greater Helsinki, at the Myyrmanni shopping mall. A bomb was hidden in a backpack, which exploded in the central square of the shopping center on top of a metal waste container, located in the center of the square, at 19:36. Five people were instantly killed , including the bomber. The waste container was shattered, and fragments of the structure increased the amount of shrapnel and the devastation. The explosion ruined 400 m² of the shopping center, carved a 10-cm deep crater in the floor where the waste container had stood and blew the glass dome over the square up and outwards from the mall. In total seven died, including two teenagers and a 7-year-old. 159 were injured, including 10 children. 66 victims required hospitalization with the remainder treated and released at the scene. The bombing took place during the pre-weekend shopping surge late on a Friday afternoon, with 1,000–2,000 people in the shopping center, including many children who had come to see a clown performance.

Details
The bomb carrier was Petri Erkki Tapio Gerdt (April 17, 1983 – October 11, 2002), who was killed in the explosion. He was a quiet 19-year-old chemical engineering student at EVTEK (Espoo-Vantaa Institute of Technology) and a hobbyist bomb-maker. Gerdt was known to have had no notable friends. He  played basketball and had no prior criminal record. He was also an active member of Kotikemia (lit. "home chemistry"), an online forum for amateur chemists. The moderator of Kotikemia was acquitted of responsibility in court. The explosive device was likely constructed in Gerdt's apartment. Investigations revealed that some kind of a timer was also used. Kotikemia was shut down by the authorities following the bombing.

Investigation 
The Finnish National Bureau of Investigation  investigated the event as six accounts of murder, one account of aggravated criminal mischief and one account of an explosives offence. The case was closed in January 2003 without any indictments as Gerdt was the sole suspect. Gerdt's motive for the bombing was not ascertained during the investigation. There was no evidence found that Gerdt had links to any outside groups or to any international terrorist organizations.

Reactions
The bombing was especially shocking for Finland and the other Nordic countries, where bombings are extremely rare.

Aftermath
On October 15, 2002, a national day of mourning was held throughout Finland. Some government buildings were closed, a moment of silence was held in the Parliament and flags ordered to be flown at half staff. The shopping center was closed for repairs for nearly three weeks before re-opening later in October.

Legacy
Petri Gerdt's father, Armas, wrote the book Petrin matka Myyrmanniin ("Petri's Road to Myyrmanni") about the incident.

References

External links
 Petrin matka Myyrmanniin, Suomalainen.com bookstore

Vantaa
Shopping mall bombings
Improvised explosive device bombings in Europe
Mass murder in 2002
2002 murders in Finland
October 2002 events in Europe